Kafeh Hajjiabad (also Romanized as Kāfeh Ḩājjīābād) is a village in Eskelabad Rural District, Nukabad District, Khash County, Sistan and Baluchestan Province, Iran. At the 2006 census, its population was 30, in 9 families.

References 

Populated places in Khash County